Madison County Bridge No. 149 is a historic Pratt Through Truss bridge located at Pendleton, Madison County, Indiana.  It was built about 1920, and measures 124 feet long. The bridges features rivets instead of pins in its construction.

It was listed in the National Register of Historic Places in 2008.

References

Pendleton, Indiana
Road bridges on the National Register of Historic Places in Indiana
Truss bridges in the United States
Bridges completed in 1920
Transportation buildings and structures in Madison County, Indiana
National Register of Historic Places in Madison County, Indiana